The Ardila is a river of Spain and Portugal and a tributary of the Guadiana. A portion of the river forms the Portugal–Spain border.

Rivers of Spain
Rivers of Portugal
International rivers of Europe
Portugal–Spain border
Tributaries of the Guadiana River